Simone Majoli (1520 – 9 January 1597) was an Italian canon lawyer, bishop and author. His encyclopedic work Dies caniculares (Dog days), covered a wide range of topics in natural history, demonology and other subjects such as werewolves. First published in 1597, it ran to several later editions. He is mentioned in the early history of the explanation of fossils, by Charles Lyell, as a pioneer of volcanic explanations.

He was born in Asti. On 16 Jun 1572, Simone Majoli was appointed during the papacy of Pope Gregory XIII as Bishop of Vulturara e Montecorvino. He served as Bishop of Vulturara e Montecorvino until his death on 1597.

Notes

External links and additional sources 
 (for Chronology of Bishops) 
 (for Chronology of Bishops) 

1520 births
1597 deaths
Bishops in Apulia
Canon law jurists
16th-century Italian Roman Catholic bishops
16th-century Italian jurists
Bishops appointed by Pope Gregory XIII